Jason Isaacs has been the recipient of various awards and awards nominations over the course of his career. He is known for many roles including Colonel William Tavington in The Patriot (2000), Captain Michael D. Steele in Black Hawk Down (2001), Lucius Malfoy in the Harry Potter film series (2002–2011), Captain Hook in Peter Pan (2003), Marshal Georgy Zhukov in The Death of Stalin (2017), and Vasili in Hotel Mumbai (2018). His other films include Divorcing Jack (1998), The End of the Affair (1999), Sweet November (2001), The Tuxedo (2002), Nine Lives (2005), Friends with Money (2006), Good (2008), Green Zone (2010), Abduction (2011), A Cure for Wellness (2016), and Mass (2021).

He was nominated for the Golden Globe Award for Best Actor – Miniseries or Television Film for The State Within (2006) and for the British Academy Television Award for Best Actor for his portrayal of Harry H. Corbett in The Curse of Steptoe (2008). He also was nominated for the International Emmy Award for Best Actor and won the Satellite Award for Best Actor – Miniseries or Television Film for Case Histories (2011–2013) and was nominated for the Satellite Award for Best Actor – Television Series Drama for Brotherhood (2006–2008).

Awards and nominations

Behind the Voice Actors Awards

British Academy Television Awards

Crime Thriller Awards

Critics' Choice Television Awards

DiscussingFilm Critics Awards

Empire Awards

Georgia Film Critics Association Awards

Gold Derby Awards

Golden Globe Awards

Greater Western New York Film Critics Association Awards

IGN Summer Movie Awards

Independent Spirit Awards

Indiana Film Journalists Association

London Critics' Circle Film Awards

Music City Film Critics' Association Awards

North Carolina Film Critics Association

Phoenix Film Critics Society Awards

San Diego Film Critics Society Awards

Satellite Awards

Saturn Awards

See also
Jason Isaacs filmography

References

External links

Lists of awards received by British actor